Mahathir Mohamad formed the sixth Mahathir cabinet after being invited by Tuanku Salahuddin Abdul Aziz Shah to begin a new government following the 29 November 1999 general election in Malaysia. Prior to the election, Mahathir led (as Prime Minister) the fifth Mahathir cabinet, a coalition government that consisted of members of the component parties of Barisan Nasional. It was the 14th cabinet of Malaysia formed since independence.

This is a list of the members of the sixth cabinet of the fourth Prime Minister of Malaysia, Mahathir Mohamad.

Composition

Full members
The federal cabinet consisted of the following ministers:

Deputy ministers

See also
 Members of the Dewan Rakyat, 10th Malaysian Parliament
 List of parliamentary secretaries of Malaysia#Sixth Mahathir cabinet

References

Cabinet of Malaysia
1999 establishments in Malaysia
2003 disestablishments in Malaysia
Cabinets established in 1999
Cabinets disestablished in 2003